Oakland is the name of some places in the U.S. state of Wisconsin:
 Oakland, Burnett County, Wisconsin, a town
 Oakland (community), Burnett County, Wisconsin, an unincorporated community
 Oakland, Douglas County, Wisconsin, a town
 Oakland, Jefferson County, Wisconsin, a town
 Oakland (community), Jefferson County, Wisconsin, an unincorporated community